Jan Snopek (born June 21, 1976) is a Czech former professional ice hockey defenceman. He was selected by the Edmonton Oilers in the 5th round (109th overall) of the 1995 NHL Entry Draft.

Snopek played with HC České Budějovice in the Czech Extraliga during the 2010–11 Czech Extraliga season.

Career statistics

References

External links

1976 births
Living people
BK Mladá Boleslav players
Czech ice hockey defencemen
Edmonton Oilers draft picks
Ice hockey people from Prague
Czech expatriate ice hockey players in Canada
Czech expatriate ice hockey players in Finland
Czech expatriate ice hockey players in Sweden
Czech expatriate sportspeople in Norway
Czech expatriate sportspeople in Kazakhstan
Czech expatriate sportspeople in Italy
Expatriate ice hockey players in Italy
Expatriate ice hockey players in Kazakhstan
Expatriate ice hockey players in Norway